Darwinia leiostyla is an erect shrub in the family Myrtaceae and is endemic to the south-west of Western Australia. Pendent, bell-shaped, flower-like inflorescences appear from May to January. These are clusters of small flowers surrounded by larger pink, red or white, petal-like bracts.

Taxonomy
This species was first formally described in 1852 by Nikolai Turczaninow who gave it the name Genetyllis leiostyla in the Bulletin de la Classe Physico-Mathématique de l'Académie Impériale des Sciences de Saint-Pétersbourg. In 1923, Karel Domin changed the name to Darwinia leiostyla in Vestnik Kralovske Ceske Spolecnosti Nauk, Trida Matematiko-Prirodevedecke. The specific epithet (leiostyla) means "having a smooth style".

Distribution and habitat
Darwinia leiostyla occurs in the Stirling Range and Middle Mount Barren on rocky sites, along streamlines and on slopes within gullies and ranges.

Conservation status
Darwinia leiostyla is classified as "Priority Four" by the Government of Western Australia Department of Parks and Wildlife, meaning that is rare or near threatened.

Use in horticulture
This darwinia is sometimes grown as an ornamental plant. It requires a warm, dry situation and tip pruning to maintain its shape. It is suitable for container growing or rock gardens.

Gallery

References

leiostyla
Endemic flora of Western Australia
Rosids of Western Australia
Myrtales of Australia